Mycolevis is a fungal genus in the family Albatrellaceae. A monotypic genus, it contains the single truffle-like species Mycolevis siccigleba, found in North America. The genus and species was described by American mycologist Alexander H. Smith in 1965.

References

Russulales
Fungi of North America
Monotypic Russulales genera